Stockdale is an unincorporated community and census-designated place in southern Marion Township, Pike County, Ohio, United States. Stockdale has a post office with the ZIP code 45683. Stockdale is served by the Minford Telephone Company and Eastern Local Schools.

Baseball Hall of Famer Branch Rickey was born in Stockdale in 1881.
IndyCar Driver Zach Veach is from Stockdale, Ohio.

Gallery

References

Unincorporated communities in Ohio
Unincorporated communities in Pike County, Ohio
Census-designated places in Ohio
Census-designated places in Pike County, Ohio